The Chinese Canadian Military Museum Society (CCMMS) is located in Vancouver, on the second floor of the Chinese Cultural Centre. It was created in 1998 and maintains a museum in that city.

The museum has given temporary displays to the Canadian War Museum in Ottawa.

See also
 Chinese Canadians in Greater Vancouver

References

Further reading
 "溫華裔軍事博物館-為捐軀同袍爭公民權" (Archive). World Journal. November 11, 2014.
 "加拿大华裔军事博物馆特展揭幕 重现华人效忠历史." 163.com, NetEase. January 26, 2012.

External links
 Chinese Canadian Military Museum Society
 "Chinese Canadian Military Museum." Vancouver Inspiration Pass, Vancouver Public Library.

Museums in Vancouver
Chinese-Canadian culture in Vancouver
Chinese Canadian organizations
Military and war museums in Canada
Museums of Chinese culture abroad
1998 establishments in British Columbia
Museums established in 1998